The Northern Norwegian Cup (Norwegian: Nord-Norgesmesterskapet i fotball) was a Norwegian football tournament for men that was contested annually between 1929 and 1969. It was made for clubs from Northern Norway, because these were not allowed admission into the All-Norwegian cup until 1963. After the admission of Northern Norwegian teams, the cup lost its importance, and was ended in 1969.

List of champions
1929: FK Narvik/Nor
1930: FK Bodø/Glimt (under the name Glimt)
1931: Tromsø IL (under the name Tor)
1932: Harstad IL
1933: FK Bodø/Glimt (under the name Glimt)
1934: FK Bodø/Glimt (under the name Glimt)
1935: FK Mjølner
1936: IF Fløya
1937: FK Narvik/Nor
1938: Harstad IL
1939: FK Bodø/Glimt (under the name Glimt)
1940–1945: No tournament (German occupation of Norway)
1946: FK Mjølner
1947: FK Mjølner
1948: FK Mjølner
1949: Tromsø IL
1950: FK Narvik/Nor
1951: FK Mjølner
1952: FK Bodø/Glimt
1953: Harstad IL
1954: Harstad IL
1955: Harstad IL
1956: Tromsø IL
1957: Harstad IL
1958: Harstad IL
1959: FK Narvik/Nor
1960: FK Mjølner
1961: FK Mjølner
1962: Harstad IL
1963: FK Bodø/Glimt
1964: FK Bodø/Glimt
1965: FK Mjølner
1966: FK Mjølner
1967: FK Bodø/Glimt
1968: Harstad IL
1969: FK Bodø/Glimt

Total championships
9: FK Bodø/Glimt, Harstad IL, FK Mjølner
4: FK Narvik/Nor
3: Tromsø IL
1: IF Fløya

Note: after club merger in 1996 FK Mjølner have 13 championships (9 from Mjølner and 4 from Narvik/Nor). After the merging the new club was named FK Narvik - later renamed Mjølner.

Winners and finalists

Results by team

References

External links
Listing at RSSSF

Defunct football competitions in Norway
1929 establishments in Norway
1969 disestablishments in Norway
Recurring events established in 1929
Recurring events disestablished in 1969
Sport in Nordland
Sport in Troms
Sport in Finnmark